The German Indoor Athletics Championships is an annual indoor track and field competition organised by the German Athletics Association, which serves as the German national championship for the sport. Typically held over two to three days in February during the German winter, the first Unified Germany championships occurred in 1991, succeeding the West German and East German indoor nationals. The unified indoor event preceded the newly-unified outdoor German Athletics Championships in the summer of 1991. National indoor championships in relays, racewalking and combined track and field events are usually contested at separate locations.

Events
The following athletics events feature as standard on the German Indoor Championships programme:

 Sprint: 60 m, 200 m, 400 m
 Distance track events: 800 m, 1500 m, 3000 m
 Hurdles: 60 m hurdles
 Jumps: long jump, triple jump, high jump, pole vault
 Throws: shot put

In addition, the below events have indoor national championships contested annually at separate locations:

 Racewalking: 5000 m (men), 3000 m (women) 
 Combined events: heptathlon (men), pentathlon (women)
 Relays: 4 × 200 m relay, 3 × 1000 m relay

Editions

Records

Men

Women

See also 
 List of German records in athletics

References 

 

 
Athletics competitions in Germany
National indoor athletics competitions
Recurring sporting events established in 1991
1991 establishments in Germany
February sporting events
Athletics Indoor